"A Little Bit of My Love" is an electronic song produced by Scott Wozniak and featuring vocals from Althea McQueen. The song was released as a double 12" vinyl record in 1998 on Velocity Recordings, with a total of eight different mixes of the song.

Track listing 
All tracks are written by Scott Wozniak and Althea McQueen.

Charts

References 

1998 songs